The Keim Homestead is a historic farm on Boyer Road in Pike Township, Berks County, Pennsylvania. It was built in 1753 for Jacob Keim and his wife Magdalena Hoch on land given to the couple by her father. Jacob was the son of Johannes Keim, who immigrated from Germany in 1689 and scouted the Pennsylvania countryside for land that was similar in richness to the soil from the Black Forest of Germany. He thought he found it and returned to Germany, married his wife, Katarina. They came to America in 1707. Keim originally built a log structure for his family's housing and later a stone home along Keim Road in Pike Township. The main section of the Jacob and Magdelena Keim house on Boyer Road was built in two phases and it is, "replete with early German construction features ... including[an] extremely original second floor Chevron door." The exterior building material (cladding) is limestone. The finishings and trimmings are mostly original to the house; relatively unusual in a home of this period.

The Historic Preservation Trust of Berks County describes the house in this way:

There have been subsequent additions to the house, especially porches in later centuries. The Hartman Cider Press was moved from its original location in Muhlenberg Township, 11 miles to the Keim Homestead in 1975.

The Keim Homestead was listed on the National Register of Historic Places in 1974. It was designated a National Historic Landmark in 2016 as a nationally significant example of German colonial architecture.

See also
 National Register of Historic Places listings in Berks County, Pennsylvania
 List of National Historic Landmarks in Pennsylvania

References

Further reading
 Historic Farm and Barn Foundation of Pennsylvania: The Oley Valley Barn Conference Tour by Gregory Huber.
 The Story of a Grand Lady's Treasure Casket of Ancient Days.  Ms. H. deB Keim, American Monthly Magazine, Jan.-Dec., 1910.  Vol. 37 p. 18-25. Published by the National Society for the Daughters of the American Revolution.

Houses on the National Register of Historic Places in Pennsylvania
Houses completed in 1750
Houses in Berks County, Pennsylvania
National Register of Historic Places in Berks County, Pennsylvania
National Historic Landmarks in Pennsylvania
1750 establishments in Pennsylvania